The 1976–77 Liga Gimel season saw 112 clubs competing in 8 regional divisions for promotion to Liga Bet.

Maccabi Sektzia Ma'alot-Tarshiha, Hapoel Sakhnin, Hapoel Kfar Ruppin Gilboa, Hapoel Givat Haim, Hapoel Ganei Tikva, A.S. Lazarus Holon, Beitar Katamonim and Hapoel Yeruham won their regional divisions and promoted to Liga Bet.

Galilee Division

Bay Division

Haifa Division

Samaria Division

Sharon Division

Dan Division

Central Division

South Division

References
Memo no. 152 IFA 

Liga Gimel seasons
5